The 1975/76 NTFL season was the 55th season of the Northern Territory Football League (NTFL).

Darwin have won there 20th premiership title while defeating the Nth. Darwin (Palmerston) Magpies in the grand final by 38 points.

Grand Final

References

Northern Territory Football League seasons
NTFL